Muhammad Sajid Qureshi (born 28 December 1960–21 June 2013) was a Pakistani politician. He was Sindh Assembly's MPA from Karachi.

Political career 
He was elected as the member of Provincial Assembly of Sindh as a candidate of Muttahida Qaumi Movement from constituency PS-103 (Karachi-XV) in 2013 Pakistani general elections.

Death
On 21 June 2013 he was shot, at age 53.

References

2013 deaths
Deaths by firearm in Sindh
Assassinated Pakistani politicians
Muttahida Qaumi Movement politicians
People murdered in Karachi
Targeted killings in Pakistan
Members of the Provincial Assembly of Sindh
People from Karachi
1960 births